"Ye Jacobites by Name" (Roud # 5517) is a traditional Scottish folk song which goes back to the Jacobite risings in Scotland (1688–1746). While the original version simply attacked the Jacobites from a contemporaneous Whig point of view, Robert Burns rewrote it in around 1791 to give a version with a more general, humanist anti-war, but nonetheless anti-Jacobite outlook. This is the version that most people know today.

The song (no. 371) was published in 1793 in volume 4 of James Johnson's Scots Musical Museum  and in James Hogg's Jacobite Reliques of 1817 (no. 34). It also appears in a collection of Scottish songs entitled Personal Choice by Ewan MacColl. The tune is taken from "My Love's in Germany" by Hector Macneill.

Robert Burns's version
This is the version in Johnson's, Hogg's and MacColl's collections:

Ye Jacobites by name, give an ear, give an ear,
Ye Jacobites by name, give an ear,
Ye Jacobites by name,
Your fautes I will proclaim,
Your doctrines I maun blame, you shall hear, you shall hear
Your doctrines I maun blame, you shall hear.

What is Right, and What is Wrang, by the law, by the law?
What is Right and what is Wrang by the law?
What is Right, and what is Wrang?
A short sword, and a lang,
A weak arm and a strang, for to draw, for to draw
A weak arm and a strang, for to draw.

What makes heroic strife, famed afar, famed afar?
What makes heroic strife famed afar?
What makes heroic strife?
To whet th' assassin's knife,
Or hunt a Parent's life, wi' bluidy war?

Then let your schemes alone, in the state, in the state,
Then let your schemes alone in the state.
So let your schemes alone,
Adore the rising sun,
And leave a man undone, to his fate, to his fate.
And leave a man undone, to his fate.

Original lyrics

References

External links
Digitised copy of volumes 1 and 2 of The Relics of Jacobite Scotland by James Hogg, printed between 1819 and 1821, from National Library of Scotland. JPEG, PDF, XML versions.
Digitised copy of Scots Musical Museum by James Johnson printed between 1787 and 1803, from National Library of Scotland. JPEG, PDF, XML versions.

Traditional ballads
Scottish folk songs